Unicode supports several phonetic scripts and notations through its existing scripts and the addition of extra blocks with phonetic characters. These phonetic characters are derived from an existing script, usually Latin, Greek or Cyrillic. Apart from the International Phonetic Alphabet (IPA), extensions to the IPA and obsolete and nonstandard IPA symbols, these blocks also contain characters from the Uralic Phonetic Alphabet and the Americanist Phonetic Alphabet.

Phonetic scripts
The International Phonetic Alphabet (IPA) makes use of letters from other writing systems as most phonetic scripts do. IPA notably uses Latin, Greek and Cyrillic characters. Combining diacritics also add meaning to the phonetic text. Finally, these phonetic alphabets make use of modifier letters, that are specially constructed for phonetic meaning. A "modifier letter" is strictly intended not as an independent grapheme but as a modification of the preceding character resulting in a distinct grapheme, notably in the context of the International Phonetic Alphabet. For example, ʰ should not occur on its own but modifies the preceding or following symbol. In practice, however, several of these "modifier letters" are also used as full graphemes, e.g. ʿ as transliterating Semitic ayin or Hawaiian okina, or ˚ transliterating Abkhaz ә.

From  to Unicode

Consonants
The following tables indicates the Unicode code point sequences for phonemes as used in the International Phonetic Alphabet. An entry in bold italics indicates the character name itself refers to a phoneme such as

Vowels 

The following figures depict the phonetic vowels and their Unicode / UCS code points, arranged to represent the phonetic vowel trapezium. Vowels appearing in pairs in the figure to the right indicate rounded and unrounded variations respectively. Again, characters with Unicode names referring to phonemes are indicated by bold text. Those with explicit application notes are indicated by bold italic text. Those from borrowed unchanged from another script (Latin, Greek or Cyrillic) are indicated by italics. Before and after a bullet are the unrounded • rounded vowels.

Diacritics 
Diacritics may be encoded as either modifier (e.g. ˳) or combining (e.g.  ◌̥) characters.

Unicode blocks
 Basic Latin (0020–007E), IPA example: Open front unrounded vowel (0061)
 Latin-1 Supplement (00A0–00FF), IPA example: Near-open front unrounded vowel (00E6)
 Latin Extended-A (0100–017F), IPA example: Voiceless pharyngeal fricative (0127)
 Latin Extended-B (0180–024F), IPA example: Tenuis dental click (01C0 0287)
 IPA Extensions (0250–02AF), IPA example: Near-open central vowel (0250)
 Spacing Modifier Letters (02B0–02FF), IPA example: Palatal ejective (0063 02BC)
 Combining Diacritical Marks (0300–036F), IPA example: Near-close central unrounded vowel (026A 0308)
 Greek and Coptic (0370–03FF), IPA example: Voiced bilabial fricative (03B2)
 Combining Diacritical Marks Extended (1AB0–1AFF), extIPA examples: combining parentheses
 Combining Diacritical Marks Supplement (1DC0–1DFF), IPA example: Rising-falling contour tone (1DC8)
 General Punctuation (2000–206F), IPA example: Linking (absence of a break) (203F)
 Superscripts and Subscripts (2070–209F), IPA example: Nasal release (207F)
 Arrows (2190–21FF), IPA example: Global rise (2197)
 Latin Extended-C (2C60–2C7F), IPA example: Labiodental flap (2C71)
 Modifier Tone Letters (A700–A71F), IPA example: Upstep (A71B)
 Phonetic Extensions (1D00–1D7F)
 Phonetic Extensions Supplement (1D80–1DBF)
 Latin Extended-D (A720–A7FF)
 Latin Extended-E (AB30–AB6F)
 Latin Extended-F (10780–107BF)
 Latin Extended-G (1DF00–1DFFF)

Unicode blocks with many phonetic symbols
Six Unicode blocks contain many phonetic symbols:

IPA Extensions (U+0250–02AF)

Spacing Modifier Letters (U+02B0–02FF)

The characters in the "Spacing Modifier Letters" block are intended as forming a unity with the preceding letter (which they "modify"). E.g. the character  isn't intended simply as a superscript h (h), but as the mark of aspiration placed after the letter being aspirated, as in  "aspirated voiceless bilabial plosive". The block contains:
Latin superscript modifier letters: (U+02B0–U+02B8):  ʰ aspiration;	ʱ breathy voice, murmured;	ʲ palatalization;	ʳ, 	ʴ, ʵ, ʶ r-coloring or r-offglides; 	ʷ labialization;	ʸ palatalization, Americanist usage for U+02B2
Miscellaneous phonetic modifiers: (U+02B9–U+02D7): ʹ 	ʺ 	ʻ 	ʼ 	ʽ 	ʾ 	ʿ 	ˀ 	ˁ 	˂ 	˃ 	˄ 	˅ 	ˆ 	ˇ 	ˈ 	ˉ 	ˊ 	ˋ 	ˌ 	ˍ 	ˎ 	ˏ 	ː 	ˑ 	˒ 	˓ 	˔ 	˕ 	˖ 	˗ 	
Spacing clones of diacritics: (U+02D8–U+02DD): ˘ breve; 	˙ dot above;	˚ ring above;	˛ ogonek;	˜ small tilde;	˝ double acute accent	
Additions based on 1989 IPA: (U+02DE–U+02E4): ˞ 	 ˟ 	ˠ 	ˡ 	ˢ 	ˣ 	ˤ 	
Tone letters: (U+02E5–U+02E9): ˥ 	˦ 	˧ 	˨ 	˩ 	
Extended Bopomofo tone marks: ; 
IPA modifiers: , unaspirated 	
Other modifier letters:  for Nenets
Uralic Phonetic Alphabet (UPA) modifiers: (U+02EF–U+02FF): 	˯	˰ 	˱ 	˲ 	˳ 	˴ 	˵ 	˶ 	˷ 	˸ 	˹ 	˺ 	˻ 	˼ 	˽ 	˾ 	˿

Phonetic Extensions (U+1D00–1D7F)

This block, together with Phonetic Extensions Supplement below, contains:
 Small capitals "ɢ ɪ ɴ ɶ ʀ ʏ ʙ ʜ ʟ"
 Turned small letters "ɐ ɥ ɯ ɹ ɺ ɻ ʇ ʌ ʍ ʎ ʞ ʮ ʯ"
 Extra small capitals "ʁ ʛ ᴀ ᴁ ᴃ ᴄ ᴅ ᴆ ᴇ ᴊ ᴋ ᴌ ᴍ ᴎ ᴏ ᴐ ᴘ ᴙ ᴚ ᴛ ᴜ ᴠ ᴡ ᴢ ᴣ ᴦ ᴧ ᴨ ᴩ ᴪ"
 Letters with palatal hooks "ƫ ᶀ ᶁ ᶂ ᶃ ᶄ ᶅ ᶆ ᶇ ᶈ ᶉ ᶊ ᶋ ᶌ ᶍ ᶎ ᶪ ᶵ"
 Letters with retroflex hooks "ᶏ ᶐ ᶒ ᶓ ᶔ ᶕ ᶖ ᶗ ᶘ ᶙ ᶚ ᶩ ᶯ ᶼ"

Phonetic Extensions Supplement (U+1D80–1DBF)

Modifier Tone Letters (U+A700–A71F)

Superscripts and Subscripts (U+2070–209F)

Font support for IPA

Input by selection from a screen

Many systems provide a way to select Unicode characters visually. ISO/IEC 14755 refers to this as a screen-selection entry method.

Microsoft Windows has provided a Unicode version of the Character Map program (find it by hitting  then type charmap then hit ) since version NT 4.0 – appearing in the consumer edition since XP. This is limited to characters in the Basic Multilingual Plane (BMP). Characters are searchable by Unicode character name, and the table can be limited to a particular code block. More advanced third-party tools of the same type are also available (a notable freeware example is BabelMap).

macOS provides a "character palette" with much the same functionality, along with searching by related characters, glyph tables in a font, etc. It can be enabled in the input menu in the menu bar under System Preferences → International → Input Menu (or System Preferences → Language and Text → Input Sources) or can be viewed under Edit → Emoji & Symbols in many programs.

Equivalent tools – such as gucharmap (GNOME) or kcharselect (KDE) – exist on most Linux desktop environments.

See also
Unicode symbols
Universal Character Set characters
Latin script in Unicode
IPA

References

External links 
 Links to PDFs of Unicode codes for several phonetic symbol sets

Unicode